Copper Project is a proprietary web-based project-management tool, first launched in 2001 by Element Software. As of 2011, it is used predominantly by creative consultancies. Copper is provided via SAAS.

The software intends to provide project and file management features, along side other business elements such as invoicing and time sheets.

Reviews
The Copper Project was voted one of the Top 20 Project Management Software products 2013.

The software has been featured in publications such as Mashable,.

See also
 Project management software
 List of project management software
 Project management
 Web 2.0

References

External links
Official site
Element Software

Project management software
2001 software
Projects established in 2001